Bjørn Tore Hansen (born 7 March 1966) is a Norwegian retired footballer and football administrator.

He represented Norway as a youth international and spent his entire career from 1983 to 1992 at Bodø/Glimt. Amassing over 300 first-team games, he finally helped secure promotion from the second tier in 1992. He then became known as Bodø/Glimt's managing director from 1992 to 1997, chairman of the board from 2002 to 2005 and executive director from 2009 to 2017.

References

1966 births
Living people
Norwegian footballers
Sportspeople from Bodø
FK Bodø/Glimt players
Norwegian First Division players
Norway youth international footballers
FK Bodø/Glimt non-playing staff
Norwegian sports executives and administrators
Association footballers not categorized by position